Hong Kong and Macau Lutheran Church Queen Maud Secondary School is located in Hau Tak Estate, Tseung Kwan O, New Territories, Hong Kong. It is a memorial school for the Norwegian queen Maud of Wales, sponsored by the HK & Macau Lutherean Church.

References

External links

 Official Site

Protestant secondary schools in Hong Kong
Tseung Kwan O